Half of Gosport Borough Council in Hampshire, England is elected every two years.  Until 2002 the council was elected by thirds.

Political control
Since the foundation of the council in 1973 political control of the council has been held by the following parties:

Leadership
The leaders of the council (formally the chair of the policy and organisation board) since 2008 have been:

Council elections
1973 Gosport Borough Council election
1976 Gosport Borough Council election
1979 Gosport Borough Council election (New ward boundaries)
1980 Gosport Borough Council election
1982 Gosport Borough Council election
1983 Gosport Borough Council election
1984 Gosport Borough Council election
1986 Gosport Borough Council election
1987 Gosport Borough Council election
1988 Gosport Borough Council election
1990 Gosport Borough Council election
1991 Gosport Borough Council election
1992 Gosport Borough Council election
1994 Gosport Borough Council election
1995 Gosport Borough Council election
1996 Gosport Borough Council election
1998 Gosport Borough Council election
1999 Gosport Borough Council election
2000 Gosport Borough Council election
2002 Gosport Borough Council election (New ward boundaries)
2004 Gosport Borough Council election
2006 Gosport Borough Council election
2008 Gosport Borough Council election
2010 Gosport Borough Council election
2012 Gosport Borough Council election
2014 Gosport Borough Council election
2016 Gosport Borough Council election
2018 Gosport Borough Council election
2021 Gosport Borough Council election
2022 Gosport Borough Council election

Borough result maps

By-election results

References

 By-election results

External links
 Gosport Borough Council

 
Politics of Gosport
Gosport
Gosport